XHDM-FM is a radio station on 102.7 FM in Hermosillo, Sonora, Mexico.

History
XEDM-AM 1580 received its concession on November 30, 1950. It was owned by Radio Pacífico, S.A., with a 50,000-watt signal at all hours.

On October 20, 1998, XEDM was approved to move its tower to Cerro La Cementera and reduced power to 10,000 watts.

XEDM was approved to migrate to FM in 2011 as XHDM-FM 102.7.

In September 2022, Grupo ACIR ceased operating the station with its  Regional Mexican format. The move came as ACIR sold several stations in various markets. Uniradio then began programming XHDM, resulting in the migration of La Zeta to that frequency from XHMV-FM 93.9, which it did not own outright.

References

Radio stations in Sonora
Grupo ACIR